is a railway station in the city of Fukushima, Fukushima Prefecture, Japan operated by Fukushima Kōtsū. The station's name translates to "In Front of the Art Museum and Library", as it is the station that serves the Fukushima Prefectural Museum of Art and the Fukushima Prefectural Library.

Lines

Station layout
Bijutsukantoshokanmae Station has a single island platform connected to the station building by a level crossing at the end of the platform. It is staffed in the morning and evening. There is a proof-of-departure ticket machine, a restroom, a beverage vending machine, and a bench located at the station.

Platforms

Adjacent stations

History
Moriai Station was reopened in a new location. It was renamed to its present name in 1991.

Surrounding area
Fukushima Prefectural Museum of Art
Fukushima Prefectural Library

See also
 List of railway stations in Japan

External links

  

Railway stations in Japan opened in 1924
Railway stations in Fukushima Prefecture
Fukushima Kōtsū Iizaka Line
Fukushima (city)